Souarata Cissé (born 16 January 1986) is a French-Malian basketball player who plays for CEP Lorient. He has also played for French Pro A league clubs Pau-Orthez, Paris, Rouen and Hyères-Toulon Var Basket.

References

External links
FIBA Profile

French men's basketball players
Malian men's basketball players
1986 births
Living people
BC Orchies players
HTV Basket players
Nanterre 92 players
Rouen Métropole Basket players
Lille Métropole BC players
CEP Lorient players
Élan Béarnais players
JL Bourg-en-Bresse players
Hermine Nantes Basket players
21st-century Malian people